Ferenc Molnár (born 4 February 1904, date of death unknown) was a Hungarian athlete. He competed in the men's triple jump at the 1928 Summer Olympics.

References

1904 births
Athletes (track and field) at the 1928 Summer Olympics
Hungarian male triple jumpers
Olympic athletes of Hungary
Place of birth missing
Year of death missing